Cabonne Council is a local government area in the Central West region of New South Wales, Australia. The Shire is located adjacent to the Mitchell Highway and the Broken Hill railway line, partly surrounding the City of Orange. The administrative centre is located at Molong.

More than half of the businesses in the region, being 858 of 1683, are classified as part of the agricultural sector.

The mayor of the Cabonne Council is Cr. Kevin Beatty, an independent politician.

Towns and localities
The towns and localities in the Cabonne Council area are:

Demographics

Council

Current composition and election method
Cabonne Shire Council is composed of nine Councillors elected proportionally as a single ward. All Councillors are elected for a fixed four-year term of office. The Mayor is elected by the Councillors at the first meeting of the council. The most recent election was held on 4 December 2021, and the makeup of the council is as follows:

The current Council, elected in 2021, in order of election, is:

History
The first Australian gold rush occurred at Ophir within the present shire boundary.

Cabonne Shire was formed in 1978 following the amalgamation of Molong Shire, Boree Shire and the greater part of Canobolas Shire.

Proposed amalgamation
As a result of the State Government's decision to not proceed with proposed council amalgamations, this no longer applies.

Industry
The Manildra Group flour mill, one of the ten largest flour mills globally, is located within the shire at Manildra.

References

External links
 Cabonne Council

 
Local government areas of New South Wales